The Appetite for Construction Tour was a three-month 2007 concert tour that was co-headlined by rock bands Switchfoot and Relient K, with special guests Ruth.

The tour was unique in that none of the bands involved were touring to push a new album or single. They embarked on the tour to benefit Habitat For Humanity, and donated one dollar per ticket sold to the organization. At end of the tour, the bands had raised over $100,000 for Habitat.

Switchfoot frontman Jon Foreman also co-wrote a song with Relient K singer Matt Thiessen called "Rebuild" for the tour. It was released as a "donation single" on Switchfoot's website, with options to donate time or money to Habitat For Humanity, in exchange for the song.

The tour was Tour Managed by Jennifer Manning and Production Managed by Scott Cannon. It played mostly in indoor arenas or stadiums, as opposed to small rock clubs, Switchfoot's favored stomping grounds. The tour's name is a reference to "Appetite for Destruction", the debut album of American hard rock band Guns N' Roses.

Show and Set list

Ruth
Ruth was the first band to perform at the shows, playing 4-5 songs in a half-hour-long set.

Relient K
Relient K was the first of the headlining acts to perform, with their set usually lasting about an hour and a half. The set list featured hits like "Be My Escape" and "Who I Am Hates Who I've Been" from their 2004 breakthrough record, "Mmhmm", as well as some of their older classics and newer songs. The band did not perform an encore, playing all their songs in one set.

The band also routinely covered the theme from the hit TV show, The Office.
For the dance-floor favorite "Sadie Hawkins Dance", the band usually brought up people from the audience to play guitar and percussion instruments for the end of the song.

Switchfoot
Switchfoot was the second of the two headliners to play, and their set usually lasted about an hour and a half as well. Because they were co-headlining with Relient K, many of the songs on this tour were old favorites from the band's multi-platinum "The Beautiful Letdown", along with their singles.

The setlist generally consisted of the following, with minor variations in song order:

 "Meant to Live intro''
 "Oh! Gravity."
 "Stars"
 "This Is Your Life"
 "Gone/Crazy In Love mash-up"
 "American Dream"
 "Dirty Second Hands"
 "We Are One Tonight"
 "Rebuild"
 "On Fire"
 "Awakening"
 "Meant to Live"
 "Rebuild"
Encore
 "Only Hope"
 "Dare You to Move"

Songs like "Ammunition" and "Head over Heels (In This Life)" were also played in light rotation.
Rebuild was played with every band member from the other two bands on-stage.

Tour dates

References

External links
 Tour Press Release
 Tour End
 Habitat For Humanity Press video
 A Special Habitat For Humanity Report by Drew Shirley

2007 concert tours
Switchfoot concert tours
Habitat for Humanity
Christian concert tours